A referendum was held in Okinawa Prefecture on 8 September 1996 about the presence of United States Forces Japan in the prefecture. The referendum followed the US military's continued occupation of land in the prefecture even after their lease to it had expired. The referendum asked: "How do you feel about reviewing the Japan-United States Status of Forces Agreement and reducing the American bases in our prefecture?"  With a turnout of 59.52%, 89% of voters, representing 53% of the electorate, agreed with reviewing the Japan-United States Status of Forces Agreement and reducing the American bases in the prefecture. Crimes committed by American military occupying the island, including the rape and beating of a 12 year old girl by three soldiers the previous year were seen as contributing to the strong opposition to the base. Following the referendum the Governor of Okinawa Masahide Ota said that the results of the referendum should be clear to "those in the U.S. Congress who still feel like they own Okinawa."  Despite the victory of those opposed to the military occupation in the referendum, due to pressure from the Japanese central government, Governor Ota allowed the expansion of the base to continue.

References 

Okinawa
Okinawan referendum
Okinawan referendum
Referendums in Japan
Elections in Okinawa Prefecture